Coleophora odorariella is a moth of the family Coleophoridae. It is found from Germany to Romania. It has also been recorded from Spain and North Macedonia.

The larvae feed on Jurinea humilis, Jurinea mollis and Serratula species. They create a tubular silken case which is covered with sand grains. The colour is brownish, with yellowish length lines. It is trivalved, up to about 13 mm long and has a mouth angle of about 45°. Full-grown larvae can be found in July.

References

odorariella
Moths described in 1857
Moths of Europe
Taxa named by Johann Gottfried Gottlieb Muhlig